Begümhan Doğan Faralyalı (born 1 January 1976) is a Turkish businesswoman who is the chairwoman of Doğan Holding. She is the youngest daughter of Aydın Doğan. She is the top 50 leading women in the world.

References

1976 births
Living people
Doğan family
Turkish chief executives